Madonna Mary Swan-Abdalla (September 12, 1928 – 1993) was a Lakota woman. Born on the Cheyenne River Sioux Reservation in South Dakota, USA, Madonna Swan prevailed over extreme difficulties including the Native American tuberculosis epidemic of the 20th century to lead a fulfilled life. She overcame the terrible conditions of socio-economic deprivation, restricted education, poor health care, and confinement to the Indian tuberculosis sanatorium and the reservation, to attend college, become a Head Start teacher, marry, raise a child, and be named Native American Woman of the Year. Madonna Swan become an inspiration to both Indian and non-Indian women.

In the autobiographical narrative Madonna Swan: A Lakota Woman's Story as told through the author Mark St. Pierre, Madonna Swan relates the stories of her life.

Early life
Swan was born on the Cheyenne River Reservation to Lakota, Western Sioux parents in 1928. She was the fifth child of ten, of which only five survived to adulthood. Makoka Winge' Win (Goes Around The World Woman) was her Indian name given to her by her father. Her parents, James Hart Swan and Lucy Josephine High Pine-Swan were born around the turn of the 20th century. Madonna's father James completed education at both Chilocco Indian Agricultural School, an Indian school in Oklahoma, where he would have been taught a skilledtrade geared toward agriculture, and two years at Haskell Indian College, which was the equivalent to a junior college. For the first five years of her life the Swan family lived with Madonna's paternal great-uncle, known as Grandpa Puts On His Shoes, or Grandpa Puts for short. American Indian elders of the age cohort of Grandpa Puts (born before 1900) were alive during the nomadic days before the Indian victory and defeat of Custer at Little Big Horn and the subsequent final Indian confinement on indian reservations. Madonna Swan's childhood was filled with beliefs and customs of the traditional Indian lifestyle. She relates a story of being cured of warts with the rubbing of a raw potato on them, applied by her father.

Boarding school and disease
Madonna attended Immaculate Conception a Catholic boarding school in Stephan, South Dakota. She expressed great pleasure in attending school and participated on the basketball team. It was at this school in the fall of 1943 were Madonna first learned that some of her classmates had tuberculosis. She became aware of the disease as did the school staff after several girls developed coughs and chest pain, weight loss, and hemorrhaging. Several girls died from what was termed quick consumption. Madonna herself manifested the symptoms of TB.

Tuberculosis and life at the Indian sanatorium
Her brother Kermit, who had introduced her to the man who she later married, was wounded in World War II and had also contracted malaria. Kermit died in spring 1944. Misfortune followed Madonna as she returned to Immaculate Conception in fall 1944 and received the official diagnosis of tuberculosis (chanhu sica – bad lung in the Lakota language). TB was a huge stigma at this time. The Indians considered it akin to a social disease. Indian homes that had a person with TB living in them were quarantined, and a red tag was attached to them. The tag was later removed when the person with TB died or went to the sanatorium.

The treatment for tuberculosis during this time was isolation (hence the sanatoria) and artificial pneumothorax or lung compression. In December 1944 Madonna Swan was taken to the Sioux Sanatorium in Rapid City. During her many years at the San, as it was referred to, Madonna was treated for her TB by the placement of bean bags on her chest while lying flat on the back for hours on end. This was the way that pneumothorax or lung compression was accomplished. The thought being that the collapsing of the lung would kill the mycobacterium tuberculosis by eliminating the air which the bacterium needed to grow, an idea supported by observations by the Italian physician Carlo Forlanini. This treatment did not however provide a cure for Madonna Swan.

Another important part of the treatment regime for TB was enforced rest, together with a proper diet and a well-regulated hospital life, these were not, unfortunately, available to those at Indian sanatoria. The living conditions at Indian sanatoria were not favorable to recovery. The food was unvaried and substandard and infested with rodents and their droppings according to Madonna Swan's telling.

Even though the drug streptomycin had been developed and shown to kill mycobacterium tuberculosis, this medicine was not available to Indians who were patients at Indian sanatoria, at the time of Madonna Swan's confinement. Both the poor living conditions and the lack of medicine were common, as health care for the American Indian was substandard due to discrimination.

In the sixth year of her confinement in the sanatorium Madonna's younger brother Orby, who also had tuberculosis, died. He had begged his sister to have their parents take him home from the sanatorium so that he could die at home. He was taken home and died later the same day. After being denied the opportunity to attend her brother's funeral, and the thought of dying in the sanatorium added to Madonna's desire to leave, which she did without permission and returned to her family home. Facing the threat of quarantine her father refused to return Madonna to the Indian sanatorium. Instead, he wrote to an old school friend, Henry Standing Bear, who advised them to see a doctor in Pierre and gain admittance to the "white" TB sanatorium, Sanator at Custer, South Dakota. This was not simple, again due to discrimination because they were Indians the authorities denied her admittance to Sanator, telling them that they had to go back to the Sioux San. Madonna's father James Hart Swan would not accept this denial and he gained an audience with the governor of South Dakota, Judge Sigurd Anderson. James Swam explained their situation and the governor, who considered himself somewhat of a pioneer for human rights, understood that American Indians were not treated fairly, arranged for Madonna to be admitted to Sanator.

Sanator
Madonna was admitted to Sanator—the South Dakota Tuberculosis Sanatorium, in the community of Sanator—in September 1950. She found this hospital very different. The grounds around the building were landscaped with trees and flowers, and patients were allowed to wear their own clothing and walk around the grounds. Her doctor, Dr. W. L. Meyers vowed to Madonna's parents that he would do everything in his power to help their daughter. The initial treatment was to pump air into the abdomen, and after that proved to be unsuccessful, they tried pumping air into her back to collapse the bad lung, which also failed. They next tried an operation called a phrenic which would permanently collapse her infected lung, again it failed to kill the TB.

After attending a conference on tuberculosis, Dr. Meyers learned of a procedure that was new in the United States. This operation required the removal of ribs and the upper lobe of her more infected lung, followed by another operation to remove the rest of the lung. Madonna Swan was one of the first patients to undergo this new procedure and much was learned about the treatment of TB from her experiences. Following the successful removal of lung and ribs, they were able to treat her remaining lung with an antibiotic designed to kill the TB bacteria (INH, Isoniazid).

With the removal of all of her ribs on one side, Madonna was paralyzed from her neck through her left arm and was unable to sit up. Battling depression, fitted with a brace to provide support, Madonna made a long and arduous recovery, gradually regaining sensation. While recovering she learned from reading and practice in the Sanator classroom how to repair jewelry. She received certification in horology (watch/clock repair).

Life after tuberculosis
In 1953, after ten years from first onset of symptoms of TB, Madonna is finally cured. She worked at Sanator as a receptionist and later left to work at repairing jewelry, watches and clocks. Her father died in 1953.

In 1956, she married Jay Abdalla, who was an army friend of her brother Kermit. Together, Madonna and Jay raised Austin Paul, the son of her sister. Madonna became an aide in the Head Start program and later a teacher. Madonna earned her Graduate Equivalency Diploma (General Educational Development - GED) in 1967. Although she completed 136 credit hours at the college level, Madonna was never able to earn her undergraduate degree due to her frail health.
She took great pride in the accomplishments of her "son" Austin Paul, who graduated from college in 1979.

Madonna Swan-Abdalla was selected as the North American Indian Woman of the Year by her tribal sisters at Cheyenne River in 1983.

Legacy
Madonna Swan is known through her story as she related it to the author Mark St. Pierre. She serves as a symbol of courage, perseverance, and strength to all her read her story.

Notes

References
 Ross, Luana. Reviewed Work(s). "Madonna Swan: A Lakota Woman's Story by Mark  St. Pierre", American Indian Quarterly, Vol. 19, No. 4. (Autumn 1995), pp. 561–565
 Schulte, Steve. Reviewed Work(s). "Madonna Swan: A Lakota Woman's Story by Mark  St. Pierre", The Western Historical Quarterly, Vol. 26, No. 1. (Spring 1995), pp. 91–92
 St. Pierre, Mark. Madonna Swan: A Lakota Woman’s Story, Norman: University of Oklahoma Press, 1991

1928 births
1993 deaths
Cheyenne River Sioux people
Native American writers
20th-century Native American women
20th-century Native Americans
20th-century American women writers
Native American women writers